Saint-Martin-la-Sauveté is a commune in the Loire department in central France.

Population

Twin towns
Saint-Martin-la-Sauveté is twinned with:

  Agbande, Togo, since 1997

See also
Communes of the Loire department

References

Communes of Loire (department)